No Skin is a 1994 Italian drama film written and directed by Alessandro D'Alatri. It entered the Quinzaine des Réalisateurs section at the 47th Cannes Film Festival. For this film D'Alatri won the David di Donatello, the Nastro d'Argento and the Ciak d'oro for best screenplay.

Cast 
Kim Rossi Stuart as Saverio 
Anna Galiena as Gina
Massimo Ghini as Riccardo
Leila Durante as madre di Gina
Maria Grazia Grassini as madre di Saverio
Marina Tagliaferri as Paola
Paola Tiziana Cruciani as Rossana
Luca Zingaretti

References

External links

1994 films
Italian drama films
1994 drama films
Films directed by Alessandro D'Alatri
1990s Italian films